Hoisin sauce is a thick, fragrant sauce commonly used in Cantonese cuisine as a glaze for meat, an addition to stir fry, or as dipping sauce. It is dark-coloured in appearance and sweet and salty in taste. Although regional variants exist, hoisin sauce usually includes soybeans, fennel, red chili peppers, and garlic. Vinegar, five-spice powder, and sugar are also commonly added.

Name 

The word hoisin is derived from the Chinese words for "seafood", although the sauce does not contain any seafood ingredients and is not commonly consumed with seafood. The reason for the name is "seafood flavour", a common adjective in Chinese cuisine, especially Sichuanese ("fish fragrant").

Ingredients
The key ingredient of hoisin sauce is fermented soybean paste.

Some hoisin sauce ingredients include starches such as sweet potato, wheat and rice, and water, sugar, soybeans, sesame seeds, white distilled vinegar, salt, garlic, red chili peppers, and sometimes preservatives or coloring agents. Traditionally, hoisin sauce is made using toasted mashed soybeans.

Uses in regional cuisines

Cantonese cuisine
Hoisin sauce is used in Cantonese cuisine as a marinade sauce for meat or as a dipping sauce.

Hoisin sauce can be used as a marinade sauce for meat such as char siu.

Hoisin sauce can be used as a dipping sauce for steamed or panfried rice noodle roll (chángfĕn 肠粉).

American cuisine 
Hoisin sauce can be used as a dipping sauce for Peking duck and lettuce wraps.

Hoisin sauce can be used as a dipping sauce for moo shu pork.

Vietnamese cuisine
In Vietnamese, hoisin sauce is called . The hoisin sauce is also used to make a dipping sauce for Vietnamese  (often translated as 'spring roll') and other similar dishes. In cooking, it can be used for glazing broiled chicken.

See also

 Duck sauce
 List of dips
 List of Chinese sauces
 List of sauces
 Oyster sauce
 Plum sauce
 Siu haau sauce, primary Chinese barbecue sauce
 Soy sauce
 Sweet and sour sauce

References

External links
 More about hoisin sauce and recipes
 What Are the Origins of Hoisin Sauce from realclearlife.com

Chinese condiments
Chinese sauces
Vietnamese cuisine